The Michener Center for Writers is a Masters of Fine Arts program in fiction, poetry, playwriting, and screenwriting at the University of Texas at Austin. It is widely regarded as one of the top creative writing programs in the world. Bret Anthony Johnston is the current director of the program. Previously, James Magnuson ran the program for more than 20 years. UT Resident English Department faculty include Elizabeth McCracken, Edward Carey, Roger Reeves, and Michener Center faculty include Amy Hempel, Joanna Klink and rotating guest faculty.

History

The program was founded in the early 1990s through a generous endowment from James A. Michener and Mari Sabusawa Michener. It was originally called the Texas Center for Writers, but changed its name to honor Mr. Michener after his death in 1997.

Fellowships

The MFA in Writing is a three-year, full-time residency program, unique in its dual-discipline focus. While writers apply and are admitted in a primary field of concentration—chosen from fiction, poetry, playwriting or screenwriting—they have the opportunity to develop work in a second field during their program of study. The program operates through competitive entry and offers a generous fellowship that includes tuition, a stipend, and other fees. Classes are taught by nationally recognized writers as visiting and adjunct faculty and by faculty in the Departments of English, Radio Television and Film, and Theatre & Dance. Fellows are eligible to submit to the Keene Prize for Literature. Winners receive $50,000 and three runners-up receive $20,000.

Notable alumni
 Kevin Powers, National Book Award Finalist for The Yellow Birds 
Lara Prescott, author of The Secrets We Kept 
Leah Hampton, author of F*ckface 
Maria Reva, author of Good Citizens Need Not Fear 
 Fiona McFarlane, Dylan Thomas Prize winner for The High Places
 Sindya Bhanoo, author of Seeking Fortune Elsewhere
 Karan Mahajan, National Book Award Finalist for The Association of Small Bombs
 Kelly Luce, Radcliffe Institute fellow, author of the novel Pull Me Under and story collection Three Scenarios in Which Hana Sasaki Grows a Tail
 Philipp Meyer, Guggenheim Fellow, Pulitzer Prize Finalist, and author of American Rust and The Son
 Domenica Ruta, author of the memoir With or Without You
 James Hannaham, author of God Says No and Delicious Foods
 Brian Hart, author of Then Came the Evening and The Bully of Order
 Brian McGreevy, novelist and co-creator of Hemlock Grove
 Sam Taylor, Poet, author The Book of Fools
 Mary Miller, author of Last Days of California
 Alix Ohlin, author of Inside and Signs & Wonders
 Roger Reeves, Poet, author of King Me
 Michael McGriff, Poet, author of Dismantling the Hills, Home Burial
 Carrie Fountain, Poet, author of Burn Lake and Instant Winner
 Bruce Snider, Poet, author of The Year We Studied Women and Paradise Indiana
 Matthew Dickman, Poet, author of Mayakovsky's Revolver and All American Poem
 Michael Dickman, Poet, author of The End of the West and Flies
 Sam Sax, poet
 Kirk Lynn, playwright and author of Rules for Werewolves
 Beau Thorne, Screenwriter, Max Payne
 Kieran Fitzgerald, Screenwriter, Snowden
 Ray Wright, Screenwriter, The Crazies
 Abhijat Joshi, Screenwriter
 Rivers Solomon, author of An Unkindness of Ghosts
Donika Kelly, poet
Ben Philippe, young adult author and screenwriter
Ladan Osman, poet and filmmaker

References

External links
The Michener Center for Writers

University of Texas at Austin
James A. Michener